Bloomington School District 87, often shortened to District 87, is a school district in Bloomington, Illinois. The district has six elementary schools, a junior high school, and a high school as well as a vocational school and an early education (PreK) school. In the 2014–2015 school year District 87 had 5615 total students and 703 employees. It is ringed by McLean County Unit District No. 5.

District 87 was established 16 February 1857 as one of the first school districts in Illinois.

Schools

Early education
Sarah E. Raymond School of Early Education

Elementary schools
Bent Elementary School
Irving Elementary School
Oakland Elementary School
Sheridan Elementary School
Stevenson Elementary School
Washington Elementary School

Junior high school
Bloomington Junior High School

High school
Bloomington High School

Vocational school
Bloomington Area Career Center (BACC)

References

Education in Bloomington–Normal
School districts in Illinois
1857 establishments in Illinois
Education in McLean County, Illinois
School districts established in 1857